Francis Carter Bancroft (May 9, 1846 – March 30, 1921) was an American manager in Major League Baseball for the Worcester Ruby Legs, Detroit Wolverines, Cleveland Blues, Providence Grays, Indianapolis Hoosiers, and Cincinnati Reds of the National League, as well as the Philadelphia Athletics of the American Association. His greatest success came with the Grays, when he won the 1884 World Series with a record of 84–28 (.750 winning percentage). His stops with teams were short, usually in an interim role, with his last stop being with the Reds after Bid McPhee left the job as manager.  Bancroft was 56 years old at the time.

Bass served in the 8th New Hampshire Infantry Regiment of the Union Army during the American Civil War. He was a drummer, and was wounded in New Orleans. After recovering, he returned to his regiment and achieved the rank of bugler. He died in Cincinnati at age 74.

References

External links
Baseball-Reference.com – career managing record

1846 births
1921 deaths
Baseball managers
Worcester Worcesters managers
Detroit Wolverines managers
Cleveland Blues (NL) managers
Providence Grays managers
Indianapolis Hoosiers (NL) managers
Cincinnati Reds managers
Philadelphia Athletics (AA) managers
People from Lancaster, Massachusetts
Baseball coaches from Massachusetts
Union Army soldiers